is an anime original television series produced by Madhouse. The series is directed by Atsuko Ishizuka, written by Jukki Hanada and features character designs by Takahiro Yoshimatsu. It aired in Japan between January and March 2018, and was co-produced and distributed internationally by Crunchyroll.

Plot
Mari Tamaki is a second-year high school student who wants to make the most out of her youth but is usually too afraid to do so. One day, she meets Shirase Kobuchizawa, a girl who has been saving up to travel to Antarctica, where her mother disappeared three years ago. Joined by two other girls, Hinata Miyake and Yuzuki Shiraishi, they join an expedition headed towards the Antarctic.

Characters

Main characters

A girl who attends Tatara West High School in Tatebayashi, Gunma. She is often called  by her friends. She is always curious about things that she does not know. Despite her curiosity, Kimari realizes she is not living life to the fullest and seeks to make the most of her youth by going on an adventure. One day she finds a misplaced one million yen, and seeking to return the large sum of money she soon encounters the owner and high school student Shirase. Attending the same high school they become close, and Kimari is brought into Shirase's confidence regarding her plans to someday travel to Antarctica. She was impressed by Shirase's Antarctica plan and decided that they would go together, meeting her desire to enrich her youth with new experiences.
 

She is a senior high school student attending the same high school as Kimari. A shy and quiet girl, she is also the daughter of Takako Kobuchizawa, an Antarctic observation crew member who went missing during her last expedition to Antarctica. Shirase has been dreaming of going to Antarctica in search of her mother, as she believes Takako is still alive and waiting for her. Most of her classmates make fun of her by calling her the Antarctic Empress and believing that she won't make it to Antarctica. Soon she makes friends with Kimari and confides in her Antarctica travel plan. Later the two meet Hinata and Yuzuki and form a group with the goal of journeying to Antarctica.
 

A bright and friendly girl who works part-time at a convenience store near the high school where Kimari attends. She is the same age as Kimari, but she dropped out of high school and is now preparing to take a college entrance examination. Her dream is to ace the exams. She decided to join the expedition since she has two years left before taking her entrance examination, and she wanted to do something special. Prior to joining the group she watched Kimari and Shirase bond over their travel plans and became envious of both of them. However over time she comes to enjoy their company and honesty, something she found lacking in previous friend groups.

She is a first-year high school student from Hokkaido, who has a calm and cool personality compared to the others. She is an actress who started in entertainment and commercials at the age of four and, due to her long business travels, has never had friends since she was a young child. She initially refused to go to Antarctica to do online streams about the trip, but later changed her mind after being convinced by Kimari, Shirase and Hinata. She is initially jealous of the other three girls friendship, but she later realizes that all of them are her best friends even though they had only known each other for less than a month.

Civilian Antarctic observation team

Commander of the civilian Antarctic expedition "Antarctica Challenge". She was also a member of the previous civilian expedition.

A woman who serves as vice commander of "Antarctica Challenge" under Gin. She was also a member of the previous civilian expedition.

So-called Antarctic chef who serves as the head cook of the observation team. She was also a member of the previous civilian expedition.

The captain of the observation ship, the Penguin Manju Go. Assumed command of vessel at Gin's request. Previously captained an Antarctic observation team while a member of the SDF.

Communications officer of the observation team.

Station architect of the observation team.

Geologist member of the observation team.

Astronomer member of the observation team.

Microbiologist member of the observation team.

Other characters

Kimari's childhood friend and best friend from kindergarten. She became envious of Kimari after she decided to go to Antarctica. She tries to break off their friendship but Kimari refused this and hugged her to show she still values her. They reconcile by the end of the series and Megumi goes off to the Arctic after being inspired by her friend.

Kimari's sister who also serves as a school committee member at school. She is worried but supportive of her sister who is going to Antarctica.

Mother of Shiraishi Yuzuki. She is also a manager of her daughter's works.

Shirase's mother, who disappeared  during an Antarctic expedition three years ago.

Media

Anime
The 13-episode original anime television series by Madhouse was first announced by Kadokawa during Anime Expo 2017 in July. The series was directed by Atsuko Ishizuka with Jukki Hanada writing the scripts and Takahiro Yoshimatsu designing the characters. Yoshiaki Fujisawa composed the music. The series aired in Japan between January 2 and March 27, 2018 and was simulcast by Crunchyroll. On November 18, 2022, Anime Limited announced at Anime NYC that they will be releasing the series on a collector's edition Blu-ray. The Blu-ray release will feature an English dub, produced by Studio Nano, which will premiere at Anime NYC on November 19, 2022.

Episode list

Manga
A manga adaptation illustrated by Meme Yoimachi was serialized in Media Factory's Monthly Comic Alive manga anthology from December 27, 2017 to February 27, 2019. It was compiled into three volumes.

Stage play
A stage play adaptation was announced on January 24, 2023. It will run at the Shibuya Cultural Center Owada from May 17–21, 2023. The play will be directed by Hideo Tsuchida, and is also co-written the script with Tomoharu Suzuki. The cast includes Marina Horiuchi as Mari Tamaki, Haruna Ishii as Shirase Kobuchizawa, Miyu Kishi as Hinata Miyake, and Saki Kitazawa as Yuzuki Shiraishi. Hana Taguchi plays Mari's childhood friend Megumi Takahashi, while Reina Seiji plays Mari's sister Rin Tamaki.

Reception
The anime was selected by The Verge as one of the best anime of 2018, saying that it is "genuine", and by The New York Times as the #8 International Show of the Year, with TV critic Mike Hale describing it as "a funny and moving coming-of-age story that should translate across all boundaries of age or culture." Otaku USA praised the characterization and humor and added that "directing helps a lot of the comedic timing stand out and makes some of the more familiar punchlines feel fresh".

In 2019, Crunchyroll included the anime in their "Top 25 Anime of the 2010s" list, describing it as a "heartfelt series about chasing dreams, learning to break out of self-imposed boundaries, and living a life full of adventure". IGN also listed it among the best anime of the 2010s.

Notes

References

External links
  
 
 Official English Page (Crunchyroll)

Adventure anime and manga
Anime with original screenplays
Antarctica in fiction
AT-X (TV network) original programming
Crunchyroll anime
Madhouse (company)
Media Factory manga
Medialink
Seinen manga